Edgar Cotto (born 27 January 1984) is a professional footballer who currently plays for Xelajú in Guatemala's top division, mostly in midfield.

Club career
Cotto started playing for minor league teams and joined Comunicaciones in 2007 after scoring 10 goals in the 2007 Clausura for Deportivo Mictlán, which did not save his team from relegation.

International career
Cotto made his debut for Guatemala as a late substitute in a November 2007 friendly match against Honduras and has, as of January 2010, earned a total of 6 caps, scoring no goals. He has represented his country at the UNCAF Nations Cup 2009.

Personal life
Mother: Mirna Gozalez, Father: Aroldo Cotto
Married on February 12, 2006, to Fatima, they have 1 daughter Genesis Ariana.

External links
 Player profile - Comunicaciones

References

1984 births
Living people
People from Jutiapa Department
Guatemalan footballers
Guatemala international footballers
Comunicaciones F.C. players
2009 UNCAF Nations Cup players

Association football midfielders
Deportivo Petapa players